Ty Zantuck (born 15 February 1982) is a former Australian rules footballer.

He is the son of AFL footballer Shane Zantuck and the nephew of AFL brothers Arnold Briedis and Robert Briedis.

He began his career at the Richmond Football Club after being drafted in 2000.

In 2002, he finished ninth in the Richmond's best & fairest. In round 21 of the 2003 season Zantuck kicked five goals.

In round 18 of the 2004 season against Collingwood he booted four goals.

Zantuck was delisted at the end of 2005.Bombers de-list Zantuck

Following his AFL career, Zantuck played local football for Kangaroo Flat in 2007, before joining Heidelberg Football Club in Victoria's Northern Football League where he played in their 2008 premiership side. Zantuck then moved to former junior club Strathmore for the 2010 season.

Ty Zantuck was diagnosed with suspected chronic traumatic encephalopathy in late 2021.

References 

Richmond Football Club players
Essendon Football Club players
1982 births
Living people
Australian people of German descent
Western Jets players
Heidelberg Football Club players
Australian rules footballers from Victoria (Australia)
Strathmore Football Club players
Kangaroo Flat Football Club players